The Kaweah Indian Nation, Inc., was a civic group interested in cultivating a Native American identity. The group is named after the Kaweah people and has applied for status as a federally recognized tribe in the USA in the 1980s, a petition which was denied.

Scam artists have sold purported citizenships in the non-recognized tribe, particularly to Mexican nationals who have entered the US without documents. Malcolm Webber, who called himself "Grand Chief Thunderbird IV," was convicted on six felony charges and sentenced to prison time in 2008.

Petition for federal recognition 
The Kaweah Indian Nation, based in California at the time, petitioned the US federal government for federal recognition. In 1985, their petition was denied. The proposed finding stated: "The Kaweah Indian, Inc. is a recently formed group that did not exist prior to 1980. ... The KIN is primarily an urban Indian group in Porterville, California, which has no relation to the aboriginal Kaweah Indians and did not evolve from a tribal entity...."

Nonprofit 
The group formed a nonprofit organization in Porterville, California, but their nonprofit status was revoked in 2011 not failing to file taxes for three consecutive years.

The group also formed a nonprofit in Wichita, Kansas, in 2005 but dissolved in 2008.

External links
 Man charged in alleged sale of tribal status to immigrants, L.A. Times

References

1980 establishments in California
Non-profit organizations based in Kansas
Unrecognized tribes in the United States